Kiekut is a station on the Großhansdorf branch of Hamburg U-Bahn line U1. The station was opened in June 1922, and is located in the Hamburg suburb of Großhansdorf,  Germany.

History
The railway station was built according to a design by Eugen Göbel around 1915. When the station was built, the area around it was very sparsely populated, so only the most necessary parts were built, such as the platform, stairway, and bridge to the street. No station building was built. When the tracks at the station were electrified, the westbound track was taken out and since hasn't been replaced. The track was electrified in 1921, but trains did not stop here until 1922.

In 1954 and 1994, the entrance to the station was redesigned.

Services
Kiekut is served by Hamburg U-Bahn line U1.

References 

Hamburg U-Bahn stations in Schleswig-Holstein
Buildings and structures in Stormarn (district)
U1 (Hamburg U-Bahn) stations
Transport infrastructure completed in 1915
Railway stations in Germany opened in 1922